Nunnery Colliery was a coal mine close to Sheffield at Darnall, South Yorkshire. The mining company, known as The Waverley Coal Company, also worked High Hazels Colliery about 3 miles (5 km) further east.

History 
Mining started on the Nunnery site in 1868 and it is claimed that its coal supplied half the houses in Sheffield.

The colliery was nationalised in 1947 becoming part of the National Coal Board and closed in August 1953, its reserves said to be exhausted.

The Nunnery "Paddy Mail" accident 
On 3 December 1923 an accident was caused by the breaking of a rope hauling an underground Paddy Mail train, carrying 90 men and 30 boys. Seven people were killed and around 50 others injured.

The -long rope was 19 months old but, the management stated that there was no guidance in the Mines Act (or elsewhere) as to the life, or required strength, of a rope. A section of the broken rope was submitted for examination to a local testing company and Dr C. H. Desch, Professor of Metallurgy at Sheffield University. The strain on the rope was at its highest level when the coal was being drawn, and one of the mysteries of the accident was that it occurred when the men were in the train and the strain would therefore be lighter.

James Hoyland, superintendent at the testing works said the test did not prove that the rope had materially weakened. Dr C.H. Desch said that he had examined the two pieces of broken rope 2 ft (60 cm) long taken from a short distance on each side of the fracture. He was unable to throw any light as to how the rope fractured in the way it did but it was clear that it broke in a tension pull.
The jury at the inquest returned a verdict of "accidental death".

The Locomotives 
The Waverley Coal Company locomotives could be found working at Nunnery or High Hazels Collieries. All the locomotives listed below, except those shown as being scrapped became the property of the National Coal Board from 1 January 1947.

Abbreviations 
Cylinders:
 IC Cylinders inside frames.
 OC Cylinders outside frames

Builders:
 AB Andrew Barclay & Sons Co.
 FW Fox, Walker & Co.
 HE Hunslet Engine Company
 HL Hawthorn Leslie and Company
 KS Kerr Stuart & Co.

Other
 M.D. & H.B. Mersey Docks and Harbour Board
 S.& M.R.   Shropshire and Montgomeryshire Railway

References 
East of Sheffield by Roger Milnes. "Forward" - The journal of the Great Central Railway Society, No.16, July 1984.  (This article also uses unpublished material researched for "East of Sheffield").
The Times, 7 December 1923

Railway accidents and incidents in Yorkshire
Coal mines in Sheffield
Underground mines in England
1923 disasters in the United Kingdom